The 2013 Temple Owls football team represented Temple University in the 2013 NCAA Division I FBS football season. The Owls were led by first-year head coach Matt Rhule and played their home games at Lincoln Financial Field. They were members of the American Athletic Conference. They finished the season 2–10, 1–7 in American Athletic play to finish in a tie for ninth place.

Previous season
They finished the season 4–7, 2–5 in Big East Conference play to finish in a tie for sixth place. This was their first year back in the Big East after being forced out of the conference in 2004 (the Big East would be renamed the American Athletic Conference in 2013).

Schedule

Game summaries

at Notre Dame

Houston

Fordham

at Idaho

Louisville

at Cincinnati

Army

at SMU

This game was the first in the series that ended with an actual winner. With the loss, Temple fell to 1-7.

at Rutgers

UCF

UConn

at Memphis

References

Temple
Temple Owls football seasons
Temple Owls football